Milton Lewis Schwartz (January 20, 1920 – October 3, 2005) was a United States district judge of the United States District Court for the Eastern District of California.

Education and career

Born in Oakland, California, Schwartz received an Artium Baccalaureus degree from the University of California, Berkeley in 1941 and was a Major in the United States Army from 1942 to 1945. He received a Juris Doctor from the UC Berkeley School of Law in 1948 and was a law clerk to Judge Rolfe L. Thompson of the California Court of Appeal from 1948 to 1949. He was a deputy district attorney of Sacramento County, California from 1949 to 1951, and was then in private practice in Sacramento, California from 1951 to 1979.

Federal judicial service

On September 28, 1979, Schwartz was nominated by President Jimmy Carter to a new seat on the United States District Court for the Eastern District of California created by 92 Stat. 1629. He was confirmed by the United States Senate on November 26, 1979, and received his commission on November 27, 1979. He assumed senior status on January 20, 1990, serving in that capacity until his death on October 3, 2005, in Sacramento.

References

Sources
 

1920 births
2005 deaths
Judges of the United States District Court for the Eastern District of California
United States district court judges appointed by Jimmy Carter
20th-century American judges
United States Army officers
UC Berkeley School of Law alumni
United States Army personnel of World War II